Fort Pierce North is a census-designated place (CDP) in St. Lucie County, Florida, United States. Per the 2020 census, the population was 6,904. It is part of the Port St. Lucie Metropolitan Statistical Area.

Geography

Demographics

2020 census

Note: the US Census treats Hispanic/Latino as an ethnic category. This table excludes Latinos from the racial categories and assigns them to a separate category. Hispanics/Latinos can be of any race.

2010 Census
As of the census of 2010, there were 6,474 people, 2,552 households, and 1,862 families residing in the CDP. The racial makeup of the CDP was 23.25% White, 72.35% African American, 0.26% Native American, 0.07% Asian, 0.15% Pacific Islander, 2.04% from other races, and 1.88% from two or more races. Hispanic or Latino of any race were 5.50% of the population.

There were 2,552 households, out of which 31.3% had children under the age of 18 living with them, 44.4% were married couples living together, 23.3% had a female householder with no husband present, and 27.0% were non-families. 22.0% of all households were made up of individuals, and 9.6% had someone living alone who was 65 years of age or older.  The average household size was 2.89 and the average family size was 3.35.

In the CDP, the population was spread out, with 29.9% under the age of 18, 8.9% from 18 to 24, 23.9% from 25 to 44, 24.6% from 45 to 64, and 12.7% who were 65 years of age or older.  The median age was 35 years. For every 100 females, there were 92.3 males.  For every 100 females age 18 and over, there were 85.9 males.

The median income for a household in the CDP was $25,899, and the median income for a family was $29,375. Males had a median income of $24,688 versus $21,117 for females. The per capita income for the CDP was $11,344.  About 19.0% of families and 22.1% of the population were below the poverty line, including 26.1% of those under age 18 and 12.0% of those age 65 or over.

References

Census-designated places in St. Lucie County, Florida
Fort Pierce, Florida
Port St. Lucie metropolitan area
Census-designated places in Florida